Marc Fosset (17 May 1949 – 31 October 2020) was a French jazz guitarist.

Life and career
Marc Fosset was born in Paris. He learned to play guitar left-handed after seeing Yves Montand and Didi Duprat perform, and was also influenced by Django Reinhardt's style. With Michel De Villers, Fosset began accompanying jazz and blues musicians in the Trois Mailletz club in Paris. He joined the rock band Magma, played with René Urtreger and Claude Guilhot, and in 1976 he founded a trio with Franco Manzecchi and Patrice Galas. In 1977 he formed a duo with Patrice Caratini. In the 1980s and 1990s, he toured with Stephane Grappelli. Fosset often performed in a duo with Jean-Michel Cazorla and as a trio with Laurent and Philippe Briand.

Fosset retired in 2010, because of Parkinson's disease. He died on 31 October 2020, aged 71.

Discography
 1978 Le Chauve Et Le Gaucher with Patrice Caratini (Open)
 1978 Organ with Patrice Galas, Franco Manzecchi (Open)
 1979 Boite a Musique with Patrice Caratini (Open)
 1979 Petit Voyage with Patrice Caratini, Claude Guilhot, Charles Saudrais (Open)
 1980 La Récré (America)
 1980 Live with Patrice Galas, Umberto Pagnini (String)
 1981 Hershey Bar with Michel de Villers (Ahead)
 1982 3 Temps Pour Bien Faire with Patrice Caratini, Marcel Azzola 
 1982  Troisième Acte with Patrice Caratini
 1986 Fleur De Banlieue (Vol. 2) Patrice Caratini, Marcel Azzola 
 1997 First Set (Izamusic)
 2011 Au Jazzland (Altrisuoni)

As sideman
With Stéphane Grappelli
 1973 Just One of Those Things
 1983 Stephanova 
 1984 Bringing It Together with Toots Thielemans
 1984 Looking at You
 1985 For All Seasons with Yehudi Menuhin
 1987 Grappelli Plays Jerome Kern
 1988 Menuhin & Grappelli Play "Jealousy" and Other Great Standards with Yehudi Menuhin
 1988 Menuhin & Grappelli Play Berlin Kern Porter & Rodgers & Hart with Yehudi Menuhin
 1988 Olympia 88
 1989 Anything Goes with Yo-Yo Ma
 1991 Stephane Grappelli in Tokyo
 1992 Live 1992
 1996 Stephane Grappelli & McCoy Tyner
 1999 Live at the Cambridge Folk Festival

With others
 1977 Inédits, Magma
 1988 Né Quelque Part, Maxime le Forestier
 1993 Heroes, Mark O'Connor
 2002 Jazzola, Marcel Azzola
 2003 Tonino Baliardo, Tonino Baliardo
 2007 Recidive No. 2, René Urtreger
 2008 Florin Niculescu Plays Stephane Grappelli, Florin Niculescu

References

External links
 

1949 births
2020 deaths
French jazz guitarists
French male guitarists
Fingerstyle guitarists
Musicians from Paris
French male jazz musicians